439 Class may refer to:

 Caledonian Railway 439 Class
 GWR 439 Class